The Pulverturm in Templin is a tower on the old town fortifications of Templin in Brandenburg.

It is located in the eastern part of Templin's Altstadt not far from the Prenzlau Gate. The tower was built in the early 15th century from an old semi-circular defensive structure called a Wiekhaus in the Templin town wall, which itself is a protected monument. It is made of brick and was covered by a massive brick conical spire. Because the roof was solid, it was nonflammable and acted as a powder tower for the storage of gunpowder.

Literature 
 Kristina Krüger, Dehio, Handbuch der Deutschen Kunstdenkmäler, Brandenburg, Deutscher Kunstverlag München Berlin 2000, p. 1046.
 Max Lobedan, Helmut Schmertosch, Templin und Umgebung, Stadt-Bild-Verlag Leipzig 1998, page 19.

Round towers
Brick Gothic
Templin
15th-century architecture
Gothic architecture in Germany
Fortified towers in Germany
Buildings and structures in Uckermark (district)